Sam Berry (born 12 February 2002) is a professional Australian rules footballer who plays for the Adelaide Football Club in the Australian Football League (AFL). Berry was drafted with the 28th selection in the 2020 AFL draft.

Growing up in Maffra in country Victoria, Berry played for the Gippsland Power at junior level. He averaged 17.7 disposals, 9.8 contested possessions and 6.5 tackles in 10 games at the Gippsland Power.

Berry made his AFL debut in the opening round of the 2021 AFL season.

References

External links

Adelaide Football Club players
2002 births
People educated at Melbourne Grammar School
Australian rules footballers from Victoria (Australia)
Living people